Sankayuni (Aymara sankayu the edible fruit of the thorny Jachakana shrub, -ni a suffix to indicate ownership, "the one with the sankayu fruit", also  spelled Sankhayuni) is a mountain in the Bolivian Andes which reaches a height of approximately . It is located in the Cochabamba Department, Quillacollo Province, Quillacollo Municipality. Sankayuni lies northwest of Jatun Q'asa.

References 

Mountains of Cochabamba Department